Fairlight is a suburb of northern Sydney, in the state of New South Wales, Australia. Fairlight is located 13 kilometres north-east of the Sydney central business district in the local government area of Northern Beaches Council and is part of the Northern Beaches region.

Fairlight lies between Balgowlah and Manly on both sides of Sydney Road. The suburb reaches north past Balgowlah Road and the western boundary is Hill Street.

History
Fairlight takes its name from Fairlight House built by Henry Gilbert Smith (1802-1886) on land he bought in 1853 from John Parker who had received a land grant in 1837. The house was named after Fairlight, East Sussex, a historic village in Hastings, on the south coast of England.

Fairlight was originally only the area near the beach where Fairlight House once stood, and the suburb at the top of the hill was called Red Hill, due to the pre World War II red gravel surface of Sydney Road.

Name legacy
The Port Jackson & Manly Steamship Company had a tradition of naming its ferries after the suburbs of the Northern Beaches. A paddle steamer ferry was commissioned in 1878 and named "Fairlight". In 1966, the company commissioned a hydrofoil Fairlight, which in turn gave its name to the Fairlight CMI synthesizer. In 1987 Strider and Black Shadow named the now legendary warez and demogroup Fairlight after this synthesizer company.

In February 2021 Transport for NSW advised that one of the series 2 Emerald-class ferries to commence service on the  Manly ferry service around the middle of 2021, would be named Fairlight after Fairlight Beach.

Landmarks
Fairlight has a cemetery in Griffiths Street. The Manly Fire Station is located on Sydney Road, Fairlight.

Fairlight Beach 

Fairlight Beach is located on the Manly Scenic Walkway on Sydney Harbour, which can be followed for some kilometres to Spit Bridge. The beach experiences light harbour swells and southerly winds. Though swells up to 2 metres were recorded following Hurricane Larry, it is not a surfing beach, as the shore is rocky and the break unpredictable. The beach has sand largely made up of shell grit (largely missing from the beaches on either side), and a small tidal swimming pool.

The K-12 was a 611-ton ex-submarine of the Royal Netherlands Navy (later the United States Navy) that was bought by private buyers after World War II and leased to the Port Jackson & Manly Steamship Company, who set her up as a museum ship at a custom berth adjacent to Manly harbour pool.  When storms struck in June 1949, an attempt was made by her owners to tow her to a safer berth in Neutral Bay, however the tow ropes broke, and the submarine grounded on rocks near Fairlight Beach.  The hull was lightened by salvagers then re-floated on 7 January 1951, and towed up the Parramatta River to Ryde Road bridge; however here she sank again after her seacocks were vandalised.  Some sources say that the engines and sections of the bow remain in Fairlight and are accessible by scuba divers. However, they are the remains of a large aluminum speedboat that got blown by high winds and sunk on the night of 7 January 1952.

Population
In the 2016 Census, there were 5,840 people in Fairlight.  63.6% of people were born in Australia. The next most common countries of birth were England 11.8% and New Zealand 2.8%. 84.3% of people only spoke English at home.  The most common responses for religion in Fairlight (State Suburbs) were No Religion 40.2%, Catholic 22.5% and Anglican 16.8%. The most common occupations in Fairlight (State Suburbs) included Professionals 38.4%, Managers 21.7%, Clerical and Administrative Workers 11.4%, Community and Personal Service Workers 8.2%, and Sales Workers 8.1%. The median household weekly income was high at $2,620. Housing was expensive in Fairlight, with the median weekly rent being $648 and the median monthly mortgage payment was $3,000.

Sport and recreation
Fairlight Beach is popular for swimming and snorkelling and as a vantage point to view harbour yacht races. Fairlight is home to the Manly Golf Club and Golf Course.  Shops and cafes are located in a shopping strip in Sydney Road.

Events
Fairlight is home to an annual Christmas Lights fundraising competition on Edwin Street.

References

External links

 Historical Photograph of Fairlight House
  [CC-By-SA]

Suburbs of Sydney
Manly, New South Wales
Northern Beaches Council